Ethiopians in Sweden are citizens and residents of Sweden who are of Ethiopian descent.

Demographics

According to Statistics Sweden, as of 2016, there are a total 17,944 Ethiopia-born immigrants living in Sweden. Of those, 6,225 are citizens of Ethiopia (3,319 men, 2,906 women). In 2016, there were 88 registered remigrations from Sweden to Ethiopia.

Education
According to Statistics Sweden, as of 2016, 20% of Ethiopia-born individuals aged 25 to 64 have attained a primary and lower secondary education level (17% men, 23% women), 44% have attained an upper secondary education level (42% men, 46% women), 14% have attained a post-secondary education level of less than 3 years (15% men, 12% women), 19% have attained a post-secondary education of 3 years or more (23% men, 16% women), and 3% have attained an unknown education level (2% men, 3% women).

Employment
According to Statistics Sweden, as of 2014, Ethiopia-born immigrants aged 25–64 in Sweden have an employment rate of approximately 64%. The share of employment among these foreign-born individuals varies according to education level, with employment rates of around 47% (49% males, 46% females) among Ethiopia-born individuals who have attained a primary and lower secondary education level (2,587 individuals), 70% (70% males, 71% females) among those who have attained an upper secondary level (5,739 individuals), 68% (68% males, 67% females) among those who have attained a post-secondary education level of less than 3 years (1,800 individuals), and 70% (67% males, 76% females) among those who have attained a post-secondary education level of 3 years or more (2,434 individuals).

According to the Institute of Labor Economics, as of 2014, Ethiopia-born residents in Sweden have an employment population ratio of about 53%. They also have an unemployment rate of approximately 9%.

Notable individuals

See also 
Ethiopia–Sweden relations
Education in Sweden
Ethiopians in the United Kingdom
Ethiopians in Italy
Ethiopians in Germany
Ethiopians in Denmark
Ethiopians in Norway

References

Sweden
Sweden
Ethnic groups in Sweden
+